Aldo Luis "Dean" Parisot (born July 6, 1952) is an American film and television director. He won the 1988 Academy Award for Best Live Action Short Film for The Appointments of Dennis Jennings, which was co-written by and starred comedian Steven Wright, with whom he shares the award. Among his television credits are episodes of Monk (including the two-hour pilot "Mr. Monk and the Candidate"), Northern Exposure and Curb Your Enthusiasm.

Parisot was born in Wilton, Connecticut, to Ellen James (née Lewis), a painter and art teacher, and Aldo Parisot, a Brazilian-born, well-known cellist and pedagogue. 
He graduated from New York University's Tisch School of the Arts. He took part in the Sundance Institute's June Lab.

In 2012, he was hired to direct the third installment of the Bill and Ted franchise. The film, Bill & Ted Face the Music, was released on August 28, 2020.

Parisot was married to film editor Sally Menke until her death in 2010; they had two children.

Filmography
Framed (1990)
Home Fries (1998)
A.T.F. (1999)
Galaxy Quest (1999)
Fun with Dick and Jane (2005)
Red 2 (2013)
Bill & Ted Face the Music (2020)

References

External links

Biography
Dean Parisot at filmbug

American film producers
American male screenwriters
American television directors
Comedy film directors
Directors of Live Action Short Film Academy Award winners
Hugo Award winners
Living people
People from Wilton, Connecticut
Tisch School of the Arts alumni
Film directors from Connecticut
American people of Brazilian descent
1952 births